George William York (13 December 1858 – 11 October 1944) was a New Zealand Anglican priest from the 1880s onwards.

Early life and family
York was born in Nelson in 1858, the son of Thomas York, a builder and later farmer at Bishopdale, and Emma York (née Edwards).

On 7 February 1900, at the Holy Trinity Church, Greymouth, York married Lillian Petrie, the daughter of Joseph Petrie. Lillian York held a diploma as an Associate of tahe Royal College of Music, London, and was the organist at Holy Trinity, Greymouth.

Career
York was educated at Bishopdale College; and ordained deacon in 1885, and priest in 1887. After curacies in Lyell, Brunnerton and Dunedin, he held incumbencies at Greymouth, Māwhera and Marlborough. He was archdeacon of Māwhera from 1903 until 1919; and archdeacon of Marlborough from 1919 to 1930.

Later life and death
Following his retirement, York moved to Riccarton, where his assisted his brother, Reverend Herbert York, for nine years, before going to live in Nelson.

York died in at his sister's residence in Stoke on 11 October 1944, aged 85, and was buried at Omaka Cemetery, Blenheim, alongside his wife, who had died in 1923. A memorial service was held at St Peter's Church, Upper Riccarton, on 22 October.

References

1858 births
1944 deaths
People from Nelson, New Zealand
19th-century New Zealand Anglican priests
20th-century New Zealand Anglican priests
Archdeacons of Māwhera
Archdeacons of Marlborough
People educated at Bishopdale College